Fire in the Pasture: 21st Century Mormon Poets (Peculiar Pages, 2011), edited by Tyler Chadwick, is a poetry anthology covering Mormon poets and poetry.

From the AML Award citation:

Included poets

Neil Aitken
Claire Åkebrand
Matthew James Babcock
S.P. Bailey
Laura Nielson Baxter
Mark D. Bennion
James Best
Lisa Bickmore
Will Bishop
Sara Blaisdell
Marie Brian
Joanna Brooks
Gideon Burton
Marilyn Bushman-Carlton
Alex Caldiero
Scott Cameron
Shannon Castleton
Tyler Chadwick
Elaine Wright Christensen
Michael R. Collings
Elaine M. Craig
Judith Curtis
Melissa Dalton-Bradford
William Deford
Danielle Beazer Dubrasky
Sarah Duffy
Sarah Dunster
Deja Earley
Simon Peter Eggertsen
Kristen Eliason
Lisa Ottesen Fillerup
Elizabeth Garcia
Sharlee Mullins Glenn
Aaron Guile
Laura Hamblin
Nicole Hardy
Warren Hatch
Michael Hicks
Susan Elizabeth Howe
E.S. Jenkins
Laverna B. Johnson
Helen Walker Jones
Patricia Karamesines
Karen Kelsay
Lance Larsen
Timothy Liu
Natasha Loewen
P.D. Mallamo
Casualene Meyer
Alan Rex Mitchell
Danny Nelson
Glen Nelson
David Nielsen
Marilyn Nielson
Jon Ogden
Calvin Olsen
Sarah E. Page
Jim Papworth
David Passey
Steven L. Peck
Jonathon Penny
Elizabeth Pinborough
Joe Plicka
Elisa Pulido
Will Reger
Jim Richards
John W. Schouten
N. Colwell Snell
Laura Stott
Sally Stratford
Paul Swenson
John Talbot
Doug Talley
Javen Tanner
A. Arwen Taylor
Amber Watson
Holly Welker
Terresa Wellborn
Philip White
Laraine Wilkins
Sunni Brown Wilkinson
Darlene L. Young

See also
Mormon poetry
Harvest: Contemporary Mormon Poems

References

External links 
Fire in the Pasture promotional website maintained by the editor

American poetry collections
2011 books
Mormon poetry